Gigi Graciette  is a television and radio personality best known for creating and hosting the talk show El y Ella, which aired on Telemundo. Graciette currently serves a news reporter for KTTV in Los Angeles.

Early life and career
Graciette was born and raised in California to a Portuguese mother and Venezuelan father.  At age 13, her first editorial was published in La Opinion, a Los Angeles daily Spanish language newspaper. Graciette is fluent in English, Spanish and Portuguese.

Broadcast career
Her television career began at Telemundo, where she was a feature and entertainment reporter for two national shows. She went on to produce and host her own television specials, such as The Hispanic Family of the Year.

Graciette later moved to the competing network, Univision, where she became the Los Angeles Bureau Chief and a reporter for Sábado Gigante, one of the network's highest-rated programs.

In early 1995, Graciette returned to Telemundo where she was the co-creator, executive producer and on-camera host alongside Antonio Farré of the daily talk show El y Ella. The show was seen in over 15 countries and became the highest-rated afternoon show for the network. Both hosts were replaced by Sofia Webber and Guillermo Quintanilla in 1998.

Graciette later worked for Televisa in Mexico City, where she solo anchored three one-hour newscasts a day for Televisa's cable news network "ECO," seen in over thirty countries. She also created and executive produced a daily political program called Eco Expediente and hosted her own radio show for Televisa Radio.

Since 2002, Graciette has been a correspondent for KTTV and its sister station KCOP-TV in Los Angeles.

From December 2003 until April 2010, Graciette hosted her own syndicated radio program, Ella Es... Gigi Graciette, which aired on Radiovisa 830 AM.

References

External links
Official website
FOX News Bio

American television talk show hosts
Living people
American people of Portuguese descent
American people of Venezuelan descent
Television personalities from California
Journalists from California
Year of birth missing (living people)